Christopher Richardson (born 25 June (O.S.) 1752 - 26 April 1825) was a justice of the peace and Deputy Lieutenant of the North Riding of Yorkshire.

Early life and family
Christopher Richardson was born on 25 June 1752, the eldest son of Christopher Richardson of Whitby, by Catherine, his second wife. He married Mary Holt (died 6 March 1840) on 15 February 1779, the youngest daughter of John Holt of Whitby.

Career
He was a justice of the peace and Deputy Lieutenant of the North Riding of Yorkshire.

Death
Richardson died on 26 April 1825.

References 

1752 births
1825 deaths
Deputy Lieutenants of the North Riding of Yorkshire
English justices of the peace
Whitby